Back B4 You're Lonely is an album by Butch Cassidy and Damizza, released in 2007.

Track listing 
 "Get Your Party On" - 3:23
 "Cruzin'" - 4:22
 "In 2's" - 4:38
 "Talk 2 Me" - 4:00
 "Gangsta Lean" (featuring Jayo Felony, Titus & Down) - 3:31
 "Back B4 You're Lonely" - 4:26
 "Top Billin" (featuring Barbara Wilson) - 3:51
 "Once Lovers" (featuring Sno Bunny) - 3:58
 "A View From The Top" (featuring Vanessa Marquez, Bishop Lamont & Roccett) - 4:05
 "Str8 Playa" - 3:24
 "Click, Clack!" (featuring Taje & Noni Spitz) - 4:31
 "Tragic End" - 3:14

Trivia 
An edited version of "In 2's" was in NBA Live 07.

Production 
 Executive Producer: Damizza
 Co-Executive Producers: Butch Cassidy, Anthony "Triple" Olguin, Edgar Sanchez & Aaron Postil
 Produced by Damizza (co-produced by Bronek), Damizza (co-produced by Carlos "Los" Ramirez), Damizza, Damizza (co-produced by Mikizza) & Dae One (co-produced by Damizza)

References

2007 albums
West Coast hip hop albums